Word of Mouth is a Philippine television cooking show broadcast by Q. Hosted by Sandy Daza and Patty Loanzon, it premiered in 2009.

References

2009 Philippine television series debuts
Filipino-language television shows
Philippine cooking television series
Q (TV network) original programming